KXXK (95.3 FM, "KIX 95.3") is a radio station broadcasting a country music format. Licensed to Hoquiam, Washington, United States, the station is currently owned by Alpha Media LLC.

References

External links

Country radio stations in the United States
XXK
Grays Harbor County, Washington
Alpha Media radio stations